Iveta Mazáčová (born 15 December 1986) is a Czech athlete who specialises in the sprint disciplines 60 m, 100 m and 200 metres.

At the 2006 European Athletics Championships, Mazáčová finished seventh in her 200 m heat for a 25th place overall result.

In 2011, for the third year in succession, Mazáčová won the gold medal at the Czech Indoor Championships in the 60 metres, securing a personal best time of 7.37 seconds.

Achievements 

 : Wind assisted

References

External links 
 

1986 births
Living people
Czech female sprinters